Archimestra is a monotypic genus of nymphalid butterfly. It contains only one species, Archimestra teleboas, which is endemic to Haiti and the Dominican Republic.

The length of the forewings is 19–25 mm for males and 21–26 mm for females. The ground colour of the forewings is brown with a white pattern.

References

Biblidinae
Monotypic butterfly genera
Nymphalidae of South America
Nymphalidae genera